Hock Building, also known as Standard Printing Company, Warehouse No. 8, is a historic commercial building located at Hannibal in Marion County, Missouri.  It was built in 1872, and is a three-story brick structure, three bays wide and eight deep. It features arched windows with thick cast-iron moldings above and iron pilasters at the first floor storefront.

It was added to the National Register of Historic Places in 1986.

References

Commercial buildings on the National Register of Historic Places in Missouri
Commercial buildings completed in 1872
Buildings and structures in Hannibal, Missouri
National Register of Historic Places in Marion County, Missouri
1872 establishments in Missouri